Abdalla Salum Kheri (born 11 November 1996) is a Tanzanian footballer who plays as a centre back for Premier League club Azam FC and the Tanzania national team.

International career
Kheri represented Zanzibar and faced Tanzania at two CECAFA Cup editions (2017 and 2019). He made his senior debut for Tanzania on 18 November 2018 in an official match against Lesotho.

Notes

References

1996 births
Living people
Zanzibari footballers
Tanzanian footballers
Association football central defenders
Azam F.C. players
Ndanda F.C. players
Zanzibar international footballers
Tanzania international footballers
Tanzanian Premier League players